Nie ma róży bez ognia (title in , in reference to two mixed up proverbs – There is no rose without thorns, and There is no smoke without the fire) is a Polish comedy film from 1974 directed by Stanisław Bareja. The subject is the chronic apartment shortage in Communist Poland.

The film has been released for the English speaking world with subtitles, under the title: A Jungle Book of Regulations.

Cast
 Jerzy Dobrowolski - as Jerzy Dąbczak (Wanda's former husband)
 Jacek Fedorowicz - as Jan Filikiewicz
 Halina Kowalska - as Wanda Filikiewicz
 Stanisław Tym - as Zenek (Lusia's fiancé)
 Stanisława Celińska - as Lusia
 Mieczysław Czechowicz - as Lusia's father
 Wiesław Gołas - as Malinowski (prospective client)
 Bronisław Pawlik - administrator
 Wojciech Siemion - school principal
 Henryk Kluba - as Bogusław Poganek (neighbour)
 Bohdan Łazuka - as Francik (passenger)
 Jan Kobuszewski - postman
 Wojciech Pokora - customer
 Jan Himilsbach - grounds' keeper
 Kazimierz Kaczor - male nurse
 Jadwiga Chojnacka - vendor
 Ewa Pokas - mail clerk
 Maria Chwalibóg - tenant
 Cezary Julski - attendant
 Monika Sołubianka - as prostitute Zuzia
 Jolanta Lothe - as Mrs Korbaczewska
 Krzysztof Kowalewski - militiaman
 Jerzy Januszewicz - mailman
 Agnieszka Fitkau-Perepeczko - tenant
 Jerzy Moes - customer

Notes and references

1974 films
Polish comedy films
1970s Polish-language films
Films directed by Stanisław Bareja
1974 comedy films